Rémy Girard  (born August 10, 1950) is a Canadian actor and former television host from Montreal, Quebec.

Acting career
Girard played the role of Rémy, the main character, who is dying of terminal cancer, in the Canadian film The Barbarian Invasions (Les Invasions barbares) by director Denys Arcand. This film was awarded the 2003 Academy Award for best foreign picture. Arcand's earlier film The Decline of the American Empire (Le Déclin de l'empire américain) revolved around the same characters who appear 17 years later in Les Invasions barbares. Girard also appeared in Arcand's 1989 film Jesus of Montreal (Jésus de Montréal).

Girard is the most-nominated actor in the history of the Genie Awards. He has won the Leading Actor award twice, for Love Crazy (Amoureux fou) and Les Invasions barbares, the Supporting Actor award twice, for Jésus de Montréal and Les Portes tournantes, and has garnered three other nominations, for Le Déclin de l'empire américain, La Florida, Les Boys (all four movies and the TV series),  Séraphin: Heart of Stone, and  Aurore.

Girard also starred in The Rocket, and appeared in the Will Ferrell comedy Blades of Glory. He was Paul Bougon in the TV series Les Bougon, which ran for 3 seasons on TV in Canada from 2003–2005. In 2006 he was a member of the jury at the 28th Moscow International Film Festival.

Girard also hosted a former game show called La Chasse aux Trésors that aired on Quebec television network TVA during the late 1990s.  Girard played notorious criminal Lucien Rivard in a film called Le piege americain. Girard stars also as Hervé Mercure in the thriller 7 Days, directed by Daniel Grou. Girard also stars in the 2011 Canadian action comedy InSecurity on CBC Television.

Awards
In June 2019 Girard was appointed an Officer of the Order of Canada.

Selected filmography

References

External links

Canadian Film Encyclopedia

1950 births
Living people
Best Actor Genie and Canadian Screen Award winners
Best Supporting Actor Genie and Canadian Screen Award winners
Canadian male film actors
Canadian game show hosts
Canadian male television actors
French Quebecers
Male actors from Montreal
Officers of the Order of Canada
People from Saguenay, Quebec